Parada de Lucas is a lower-class neighbourhood in the North Zone of Rio de Janeiro, Brazil.

References

Neighbourhoods in Rio de Janeiro (city)